Colopha is a genus of true bugs belonging to the family Aphididae.

The genus was first described by Monell in 1877.

The species of this genus are found in Europe and Northern America.

Species include:
 Colopha compressa (Koch, 1856)

References

Aphididae
Gall-inducing insects